Lovji Nusserwanjee Wadia (1702–1774) was a Parsi from Surat province of Gujarat in India and was a member of the Wadia family of shipwrights and naval architects, who founded Wadia Group in 1736.

Lovji Wadia secured contracts with the British East India Company to build ships and docks in Bombay in 1736. This, and subsequent efforts, would result in Bombay becoming one of the most strategically important ports for the British in Asia.

The Bombay dry-dock, the first dry-dock in Asia, was built by Lovji and his brother Sorabji in 1750. 

Lovji is considered the founder of the shipping and shipbuilder industry in Bombay. To this day, Surat remains the largest break-up beaching port (where ships are stripped and disassembled) in the world. 

Lovji had two sons, Maneckji and Bomanji.

The first Atash Adaran in India was established in Siganpur, near Surat, by Lovji Wadia, around 1760.
His descendants are the Wadia family of Neville Wadia, Nusli Wadia, Ness Wadia and Jehangir Wadia.  His great grandsons JBH Wadia and Homi Wadia founded Wadia Movietone in 1933, which had its studios at Lovji Castle (Lovejee Castle) in Chembur, Mumbai. The company even had its logo as a ship, honouring their family legacy.

References

External links
The Wadias

1702 births
1774 deaths
Parsi people from Mumbai
Businesspeople from Mumbai
18th-century Indian businesspeople

Parsi people
Wadia family